Gamma Piscis Austrini, Latinized from γ Piscis Austrini, is binary star system in the southern constellation of Piscis Austrinus. It is visible to the naked eye with a combined apparent visual magnitude of +4.448. As of 2010, the pair had an angular separation of 4 arc seconds along a position angle of 255°.

It is an estimated 214 million years old with 2.63 times the mass of the Sun. The fainter magnitude 8.20 companion, component B, is an F-type main sequence star with a class of F5 V.

Gamma Piscis Austrini is moving through the Galaxy at a speed of 24.1 km/s relative to the Sun.

Naming

References

External links

A-type main-sequence stars
Binary stars
Piscis Austrinus
Piscis Austrini, Gamma
Durchmusterung objects
Piscis Austrini, 22
216336
112948
8695